Holy Cross Church is a Roman Catholic church built in 1916 in Kaukauna, Wisconsin, United States. It was listed on the National Register of Historic Places on March 29, 1984.

Former pastors
From 1873 to 1878 the Holy Cross Chapel was a mission served by the pastors of Holy Angels Parish of Darboy, Wisconsin.

Fr. Julius Rhode (1878–1907)
Msgr. Peter J. Lochman (1908–1932)
Fr. Peter Grosnick ( ? -1947)
Fr. Andrew Quella (1947–1966)
Fr. Andrew Linsmeyer (1966–1973)
Fr. Roy Crain (1973–1986)
Fr. John ("Jack") Mullarkey (1986-2007)
Fr. Tom Pomeroy (2007–2018)
Fr. Don Everts (2018–present)

References

Churches in the Roman Catholic Diocese of Green Bay
Churches on the National Register of Historic Places in Wisconsin
Churches in Outagamie County, Wisconsin
National Register of Historic Places in Outagamie County, Wisconsin